The 2016 Indiana State Sycamores football team represented Indiana State University in the 2016 NCAA Division I FCS football season. They were led by fourth-year head coach Mike Sanford and played their home games at Memorial Stadium. They were a member of the Missouri Valley Football Conference. They finished the season 4–7, 2–6 in MVFC play to finish in a three-way tie for eighth place.

On December 16, head coach Mike Sanford resigned to join the staff at WKU where his son, Mike Sanford Jr., had recently been named the head coach. Sanford leaves Indiana State with a four year record of 18–30.

Schedule

Source: Schedule

Game summaries

Butler

at Minnesota

at Southeast Missouri State

Illinois State

Missouri State

at Western Illinois

South Dakota

at Southern Illinois

at Youngstown State

Northern Iowa

at North Dakota State

Ranking movements

References

Indiana State
Indiana State Sycamores football seasons
Indiana State Sycamores football